

2021

Moving image 

 Suha Araj
 Shirley Bruno 
 William D. Caballero
 Reid Davenport
 Amaryllis DeJesus Moleski, Terence Nance
 Crystal Kayiza
 Adam Khalil, Bayley Sweitzer
 Jenny Lion
 Jules Rosskam
 Elaine McMillion Sheldon
 Débora Souza Silva
 Martine Syms

Socially-Engaged Art 

 Sita Kuratomi Bhaumik, Jocelyn Jackson, Saqib Keval
 Joseph Cuillier III, Shani Peters
 Sherrill Roland
 Bayeté Ross Smith
 Anna Tsouhlarakis
 Jordan Weber
 Shana M. griffin

Technology 

 Wafaa Bilal
 Lars Jan
 Literature
 Anne Finger
 Mitchell S. Jackson
 Meng Jin
 Sabrina Orah Mark
 Marc Anthony Richardson
 Simone White
 Legacy Russell

Performing Arts 

 Marie Lorenz, Kurt Rohde, Dana Spiotta
 Derek McPhatter
 Julian Terrell Otis
 Will Rawls
 Tomeka Reid
 Visual Arts
 Sandy Rodriguez
 Jessica Vaughn

2020

Literature 

 Lady Dane Figueroa Edidi, J Mase III
 Wendy Walters
 Marcia Douglas
 Randa Jarrar
 Tonya Foster
 Kamau Patton
 Mark Nowak

Performing Arts 

 Becca Blackwell
 Dorian Wood
 Estrellx supernova
 Eisa Davis
 Yahdon Israel, Tyehimba Jess, Janice A. Lowe
 Papel Machete
 Nia Witherspoon
 Jawwaad Taylor
 Jumatatu m. Poe
 Jibz Cameron, Sue Slagle
 Ebony Noelle Golden

Visual Arts 

 Mercedes Dorame
 Jesse Krimes
 John W. Love, Jr
 Steffani Jemison
 Jarett Mellenbruch

Moving Image 

 Stephanie Wang-Breal
 Nikyatu Jusu
 Jasmin Mara López
 Diane Paragas
 Rodrigo Reyes

Socially-Engaged Art 

 Not an Alternative
 Jackie sumell
 Cannupa Hanska Luger

Technology 

 Angela Washko
 Nathan Shafer
 Amitis Motevalli
 Tamara Shogaolu

2019

Visual Arts 

 Alison O’Daniel
 Karina Aguilera Skvirsky
 Alan Ruiz
 Nathaniel Corum & Joseph Kunkel
 Polly Apfelbaum
 MAOF
 Alejandro Durán
 Allison Janae Hamilton
 Bahar Behbahani

Literature 

 Elissa Washuta
 Maaza Mengiste
 Joanna Fateman
 CAConrad

Moving Image 

 Nomi Talisman & Dee Hibbert-Jones
 Ramona S. Diaz
 Michael Premo
 Wes Hurley
 Kathryn Ramey
 Todd Chandler
 Daresha Kyi
 Ja’Tovia Gary
 S. Leo Chiang
 Kia LaBeija & Taina Larot
 Michelle Handelman
 Leslie Tai

Performing Arts 

 Alice Sheppard
 Martha Redbone & Aaron Whitby
 Ni’Ja Whitson
 Charlotte Brathwaite
 Meshell Ndegeocello
 Linda Parris-Bailey
 Samora Pinderhughes
 Paul S Flores, Yosvany Terry & Rosalba Rolon
 Shontina Vernon
 Cristal Chanelle Truscott
 Larissa FastHorse
 Raja Feather Kelly
 Lauren McCarthy

Emerging Fields 

 Stephanie Dinkins
 Jen Liu
 Brandon Ballengée
 Ekene Ijeoma
 Sharita Towne & Lisa K. Bates (since split)
 Victor Payan & Sandra Pocha Peña
 Niv Acosta
 Michele Stephenson
 Caleb Duarte
 Garrett Bradley
 Laura Doggett
 Elissa Moorhead

2016

Emerging Fields 

 Tanya Aguiñiga
 Zach Blas
 Peter Burr and Porpentine
 Melanie Crean, Shaun Leonardo and Sable Elyse Smith
 desert ArtLAB (April Bojorquez and Matt Garcia)
 Heather Dewey-Hagborg
 Liz Glynn
 Heather Hart and Jina Valentine
 Marisa Morán Jahn
 KCHUNG
 Yotam Mann
 Eva and Franco Mattes
 Irvin Morazan
 Laura Parnes
 Kenya (Robinson)
 Evan Roth, Paris
 Chris E. Vargas

Literature 

 Jesse Ball, Chicago
 desveladas (Macarena Hernández, Sheila Maldonado, Nelly Rosario)
 LaTasha N. Nevada Diggs
 Percival Everett
 Eileen Myles
 Dao Strom

Performing Arts 
Cornell Alston and Kaneza Schaal

Jeff Becker

Peter Born and Okwui Okpokwasili

Ligia Bouton, Matt Donovan and Lei Liang

Sharon Bridgforth

Ben Thorp Brown

Ann Carlson

Mallory Catlett

Ellen Sebastian Chang and Amara Tabor-Smith

Jim Findlay

Robin Frohardt

Sean Graney, Chicago

Brian Harnetty

Branden Jacobs-Jenkins and Carmelita Tropicana

Joseph Keckler

Heather Kravas

Ahamefule J. Oluo

Pegasus Warning (Guillermo E. Brown)

Graham Reynolds

Royal Osiris Karaoke Ensemble (Tei Blow and Sean McElroy)

James Scruggs

Erika Chong Shuch

Yara Travieso

2015

Moving Image 
 Michael Almereyda (New York, NY)
 Martha Colburn (Gettysburg, PA)
 Cherien Dabis (Los Angeles, CA)
 Christopher Harris (Oviedo, FL)
 Lauren Kelley (New York, NY)
 Maryam Keshavarz (Los Angeles, CA)
 Klip Collective (Josh James and Ricardo Rivera) (Philadelphia, PA)
 Andy Kropa (Brooklyn, NY)
 Lily & Honglei (New Haven, CT)
 Shola Lynch (New York, NY)
 Jeff Malmberg and Chris Shellen (Los Angeles, CA)
 Jillian Mayer and Lucas Leyva (Mayer\Leyva) (Miami, FL)
 Lotfy Nathan (Los Angeles, CA)
 Pat O'Neill (Pasadena, CA)
 Carlo Ontal (Jersey City, NJ)
 Lorelei Pepi (Vancouver, Canada)
 Shawn Peters (Brooklyn, NY)
 Jennifer Reeder (Hammond, IN)
 Jon Rubin (Pittsburgh, PA)
 Ry Russo-Young (New York, NY)
 Lee Anne Schmitt (Altadena, CA)
 Dan Schneidkraut (Minneapolis, MN)
 Travis Wilkerson (Los Angeles, CA)

Visual Arts 
 A.K. Burns (Brooklyn, NY)
 Heather Cassils (Los Angeles, CA)
Carolina Caycedo (Los Angeles, CA)
 Mike Crane (Brooklyn, NY)
Danielle Dean (Los Angeles, CA)
 Abigail DeVille (Bronx, NY)
 Maria Gaspar (Chicago, IL)
Mariam Ghani (Brooklyn, NY)
 Eric Gottesman (Cambridge, MA)
Titus Kaphar (New Haven, CT)
 Jon Kessler (New York, NY)
 Narcissister (Brooklyn, NY)
Brittany Nelson (Richmond, VA)
Lorraine O'Grady (New York, NY)
 Jeanine Oleson (Brooklyn, NY)
 Gala Porras-Kim (Los Angeles, CA)
 Beatriz Santiago Muñoz (San Juan, Puerto Rico)
 Carrie Schneider (Brooklyn, NY)
Anna Sew Hoy (Los Angeles, CA)
Amie Siegel (New York, NY)
 Katrin Sigurdardottir (New York, NY)
 Wu Tsang (Los Angeles, CA)
 Ivan Velez (Bronx, NY)

2013

Emerging Fields 
 Juan William Chávez, St. Louis, MO
 Julia Christensen, Oberlin, OH
 Design 99 (Mitch Cope & Gina Reichert), Detroit, MI
 Fallen Fruit (David Burns, Matias Viegener & Austin Young), Los Angeles, CA
 Ghana Think Tank (John Ewing, Maria del Carmen Montoya & Christopher Robbins), Roxbury, MA
 Nick Hallett & Shana Moulton, Ridgewood, NY
 Natalie Jeremijenko, New York, NY
 Maryam Keshavarz & Roya Rastegar, Los Angeles, CA
 Ali Momeni, Pittsburgh, PA
 Laurie Jo Reynolds, Chicago, IL
 Susan Robb, Seattle, WA
 Chemi Rosado-Seijo, San Juan, PR
 Steve Rowell, Los Angeles, CA
 Gregory Sale, Phoenix, AZ
 Miriam Simun, New York, NY
 Elaine Tin Nyo, New York, NY
 Quintan Ana Wikswo, Los Angeles, CA

Literature 
 Jessica Anthony, Portland, ME
 Jen Bervin, Brooklyn, NY
 John McManus, Norfolk, VA
 Maggie Nelson, Los Angeles, CA
 Srikanth Reddy, Chicago, IL
 Sharifa Rhodes-Pitts, New York, NY

Performing Arts 
 Kyle Abraham, Brooklyn, NY
 luciana achugar, Brooklyn, NY
 Jesse Bonnell, Brooklyn, NY
 Taylor Ho Bynum, New Haven, CT
 Wally Cardona, Brooklyn, NY
 Jace Clayton, Brooklyn, NY
 Complex Movements (Carlos Garcia, Invincible, Wesley Taylor & Waajeed), Detroit, MI
 Corey Dargel, Brooklyn, NY
 Degenerate Art Ensemble (Joshua Kohl & Haruko Nishimura), Seattle, WA
 DD Dorvillier, New York, NY
 Faye Driscoll, Brooklyn, NY
 Michelle Ellsworth, Boulder, CO
 Trajal Harrell, New York, NY
 Emily Johnson, Minneapolis, MN
 Dohee Lee, Oakland, CA
 Miwa Matreyek, Los Angeles, CA
 Neal Medlyn, Brooklyn, NY
 Mondo Bizarro (Millicent Johnnie, Sean LaRocca & Nick Slie), New Orleans, LA
 Queen GodIs & Makeda Thomas, Brooklyn, NY
 The TEAM (Jessica Almasy, Rachel Chavkin, Matt Hubbs & Libby King), Brooklyn, NY
 Arturo Vidich & Daniel Wendlek, Brooklyn, NY
 Wakka Wakka Productions (Gabrielle Brechner, Kirjan Waage & Gwendolyn Warnock), Brooklyn, NY
 Holcombe Waller, Portland, OR

2012

Film/Video 
 Cam Archer
 Robert Bahar & Almudena Carracedo
 Amy Belk & Matt Porterfield
 Brad Butler
 Lucien Castaing-Taylor & Véréna Paravel
 Eric Dyer
 Daniel Eisenberg
 Yance Ford
 Brian L. Frye & Penny Lane
 Sonali Gulati
 Kenneth Jacobs
 Nina Menkes
 Akosua Adoma Owusu
 Brian Pera
 Rick Prelinger
 Michael Robinson
 Mark Elijah Rosenberg
 Norbert Shieh
 Stacey Steers
 Deborah Stratman
 Jesse Sugarmann
 Christopher Sullivan
 Jake Yuzna

Visual Arts 
 Janine Antoni
 Patty Chang
 LaToya Ruby Frazier
 Theaster Gates
 Ken Gonzales-Day
 Taraneh Hemami
 Tahir Hemphill
 Simone Leigh
 Eric Leshinsky & Zach Moser
 Phillip Andrew Lewis
 Carlos Motta
 My Barbarian (Malik Gaines, Jade Gordon & Alexandro Segade)
 Postcommodity (Raven Chacon & Nathan Young)
 The Propeller Group (Matt Lucero & Tuan Andrew Nguyen)
 Teri Rofkar
 Paul Rucker
 Connie Samaras
 Lisa Sigal
 Jim Skuldt
 Kerry Tribe
 Joan Waltemath
 Women (Scott Barry & Neil Doshi)
 Amy Yao

2009

Emerging Fields 
 Matthew Coolidge, Center for Land Use Interpretation (Culver City, CA)
 Cesar Cornejo (Tampa, FL)
 James Coupe (Seattle, WA)
 Beatriz da Costa (Long Beach, CA)
 eteam (Queens, NY)
 Futurefarmers (San Francisco, CA)
 Catherine Herdlick (San Francisco, CA)
 Shih Chieh Huang (New York, NY)
 Lisa Jevbratt (Santa Barbara, CA)
 Jae Rhim Lee (Cambridge, MA)
 neuroTransmitter (Queens, NY)
 Richard Pell (Pittsburgh, PA)
 Stephanie Rothenberg (Buffalo, NY)
 Mark Shepard (Brooklyn, NY)
 Karolina Sobecka (Brooklyn, NY)
 Sam Van Aken (Portland, ME)

Innovative Literature 
 Paul Beatty (New York, NY)
 Kenny Fries (Toronto, ON, Canada)
 Ben Marcus (New York, NY)
 Bernadette Mayer (East Nassau, NY)
 Rebecca Solnit (San Francisco, CA)
 Deb Olin Unferth (Lawrence, KS)

Performing Arts 
 Byron Au Yong (Seattle, WA) and Aaron Jafferis (New Haven, CT)
 Victor D. Cartagena, Roberto Gutierrez Varea, Violeta Luna, David Molina and Antigone Trimis (San Francisco, CA)
 Nora Chipaumire (Brooklyn, NY)
 Steve Cuiffo, (New York, NY) Trey Lyford (New York, NY) and Geoffrey Sobelle (Philadelphia, PA)
 Lisa D’amour (Brooklyn, NY) and Katie Pearl (Austin, TX)
 Chris M. Green (Brooklyn, NY)
 Miguel Gutierrez (Brooklyn, NY)
 Robert Farid Karimi (Minneapolis, MN)
 Zoe Keating and Jeffrey Rusch (Camp Meeker, CA)
 Heidi Latsky Dance (New York, NY)
 Young Jean Lee (Brooklyn, NY)
 Los Angeles Poverty Department (Los Angeles, CA)
 Taylor Mac (New York, NY)
 Barak Marshall (Los Angeles, CA), Tamir Muskat (Tel Aviv, Israel) and Margalit Oved (Los Angeles, CA)
 David Neumann and Richard Sylvarnes (Brooklyn, NY)
 Ken Nintzel (New York, NY)
 Tere O’Connor (New York, NY)
 Tommy Smith and Reggie Watts (Brooklyn, NY)
 Deke Weaver (Champaign, IL)

2008

Film/Video 
 Kenseth Armstead (Brooklyn, NY)
 Anita Chang (San Francisco, CA)
 Erin Cosgrove (Altadena, CA)
 Marshall Curry and Sam Cullman (Brooklyn, NY)
 Rodney Evans (Brooklyn, NY)
 Lynn Hershman Leeson (San Francisco, CA)
 Tia Lessin and Carl Deal (Brooklyn, NY)
 Brad Lichtenstein and Vernon Reid (Milwaukee, WI)
 Billy Luther (Los Angeles, CA)
 Tara Mateik (Brooklyn, NY)
 Cat Mazza (Troy, NY)
 Leighton Pierce (Iowa City, IA)
 Laura Poitras (New York, NY)
 Anayansi Prado (Los Angeles, CA)
 Jay Rosenblatt (San Francisco, CA)
 David Russo (Seattle, WA)
 Luke Savisky (Austin, TX)
 Cauleen Smith (Boston, MA)
 Danial Sousa (Providence, RI)
 Banker White and Zach Niles (San Francisco, CA)
 Julie Wyman (Berkeley, CA)

Visual Arts 
 Sanford Biggers (Richmond, VA)
 Susan Brandt and Kristine Woods (Baltimore, MD)
 Kianga Ford (Boston, MA)
 Joseph Grigely (Chicago, IL)
 Wayne Hodge (New York, NY)
 Jennie C. Jones (Brooklyn, NY)
 Kalup Linzy (Brooklyn, NY)
 Naeem Mohaiemen (Dhaka, Bangladesh and New York, NY)
 Matthew Moore (Goodyear, AZ)
 Otabenga Jones & Associates (Houston, TX)
 Angela Reginato (Oakland, CA)
 Kaneem Smith (Houston, TX)
 Eve Sussman (Brooklyn, NY)
 SuttonBeresCuller (Seattle, WA)
 Mark Tribe (New York, NY)
 Trimpin (Seattle, WA)
 Lauren Woods (San Francisco, CA)
 Mario Ybarra, Jr. (Wilmington, CA)
 Bruce Yonemoto and Juli Carson (Los Angeles, CA)
 Emna Zghal and Michael Rakowitz (Grinnell, IA)

2006

Emerging Fields 

 Cory Arcangel 
 Luca Buvoli 
 REDUX CALLSPACE
 Laura Carton 
 Brody Condon 
 Hassan Elahi 
 MTAA + RSG 
 Auriea Harvey (Tale of Tales)
 Kenjji & Kito Jumanne-Marshall 
 Amelia Kirby, Donna Porterfield, & Nick Szuberla 
 Brian Knep
 Golan Levin
 Jane Marsching 
 Sheryl Oring
 Jakub Segen, Marek Walczak, & Martin Wattenberg

Digital Arts 

 Paul Vanouse
 Stephen Vitiello 
 Allison Wiese

Literature 

 Jeffrey Allen
 Alan Gilbert 
 Christian Hawkey
 Cole Swenson

Performing Arts 

 Mason Bates & Anne Patterson
 Lisa Bielawa
 Michael Bryant, Grisha Coleman, Jesse Gilbert, John Oduroe, & Robert Peagler
 Rude Mechanicals 
 Radiohole
 Danny Hoch
 Joan Jeanrenaud & Alessandro Moruzzi
 Marc Bamuthi Joseph
 Gulgun Kayim
 Locust
 Ledoh Ledoh
 Mickle Maher
 Sarah Michelson
 Bebe Miller
 David Rousseve
 Sophiline Shapiro
 Susan Simpson
 Tamango Van Cayseele
 Ricki Vincent
 Kristina Wong
 Nami Yamamoto

2005

Visual Arts 

 Edgar Arceneaux
 Olga Koumoundouros and Rodney McMillan
 James Bidgood
 Max King Cap
 Bruce Chao
 Liz Cohen
 Nancy Davidson
 Peggy Diggs
 Jeffrey Gibson
 Pablo Helguera
 Carolyn Lathan-Stiefel
 Deborah Lawrence
 Annie Han & Daniel Mihalyo
 Mark Newport
 Ruben Ochoa
 Karyn Olivier
 Susanne Cockrell and Ted Purves
 Artemio Rodriguez
 Joseph Schneider
 Kerry Skarbakka
 Noelle Tan

Video and Film 

 Natalia Almada
 Usama Alshaibi
 Ina Archer
 Bill Daniel
 Paula Durette
 Edgar Endress & Lori Lee
 James Fotopoulos
 Jennifer Fox
 Jacqueline Goss
 Brent Green
 Christina Ibarra
 Braden King
 James Lyons
 Jake Mahaffy
 Peter Sillen
 Alex Stikich
 Naomi Uman
 Edin Velez
 Glenda Wharton
 Christopher Wilcha
 Eric Wolf

2002

Performing Arts 

 Homer Avila
 Sujata Bhatt
 Maureen Brennan, Ellen Baird, Kerry Lowe, and Ashley Smith
 Ronald K. Brown
 Nick Cave
 Joanna Haigood and Wayne Campbell
 Shelley Hirsch
 Dan Hurlin
 Vijay Iyer and Michael Ladd
 John Leanos 
 James Luna
 Kari Margolis
 Bob Massey
 Cynthia Oliver
 Daniel Roumain
 Rafael Sanchez 
 Andrew Simonet
 Donna Uchizono
 Victoria Vazquez
 Richard Winberg
 Yasuko Yokoshi
 Pamela Z

Emerging Fields 

 Steven Badgett
 Cindy Bernard
 Sawad Brooks
 Tana Hargest
 Kelly Heaton
 Miranda July
 Eduardo Kac
 Heidi Kumao
 Steven Kurtz
 Suzanne Lacy
 George Legrady
 Sharon Lockhart
 Jennifer McCoy
 Mark Napier
 Sabrina Raaf
 Marie Sester
 Eddo Stern
 Faith Wilding

2001

Media 

 Steven Bognar                            
 Bill Brown
 Ellen Bruno
 Erica Cho                                  
 Ricardo Dominguez
 James Duesing    
 Kevin Everson         
 Vicki Funari
 Joe Gibbons
 Sam Green
 Vanalyne Green
 Rachel Mayeri
 Leslie McCleave
 Jon Moritsugu      
 Bill Morrison
 Suzan Pitt                  
 Reynold Reynolds
 Erik Saks                
 Jeffrey Scher       
 Elizabeth Subrin
 Chel White                    
 David Wilson           
 Caveh Zahedi              
 Marina Zurkow

Visual Arts 

 Chris Burnett, Michael Rees
 Gaye Chan                             
 Mel Chin
 Elena del Rivero
 Sam Easterson
 Hirokazu Kosaka
 Catherine Lord
 Jeannette Louie 
 Mary Lucier
 Beverly McIver
 Kay Miller  
 Franco Mondini-Ruiz
 William Pope.L 
 Dread Scott 
 Paul Shambroom
 Arthur Simms 
 Bentley Spang
 Christine Tarkowski  
 Christine Yamamoto

2000

Emerging Fields 

 Betty Beaumont 
 Natalie Bookchin
 Josely Carvalho 
 Maya Sara Churi
 Patrick Clancy
 Alison Cornyn
 Leah Gilliam 
 Jessica Irish
 Prema Murthy
 John Simon, Jr. 
 Ray Thomas
 Helen Thorington

Media 

 Peggy Ahwesh 
 Craig Baldwin 
 Roddy Bogawa
 Portia Cobb
 Adam Cohen
 Jem Cohen
 Todd Downing
 Sandi DuBowski
 Jeanne Finley
 Barbara Hammer 
 Jon Jolles
 Lewis Klahr 
 Chris Munch 
 Spencer Nakasako 
 Diane Nerwen 
 Joanna Priestley
 Scott Saunders 
 Philip Solomon
 T. Tran 
 Ela Troyano

Performance 

 Djola Branner
 Jane Comfort 
 Fred Curchack
 Brian Freeman 
 Janie Geiser
 Joe Goode 
 David Hancock 
 Rennie Harris 
 Jon Jang
 John Jasperse 
 Daniel Alexander Jones
 Lisa Kron 
 Ralph Lemon
 Richard Maxwell
 Meredith Monk
 Jennifer Monson
 Tracie Morris
 Jarrad Powell 
 Amelia Rudolph
 Carl Hancock Rux
 Elizabeth Streb
 Sekou Sundiata
 Basil Twist

Visual Arts 

 Xenobia Bailey
 Conrad Bakker 
 Erika Blumenfeld
 Tony Cokes
 Chris Doyle
 Matthew Geller
 Maria Elena Gonzalez
 Fred Holland
 Martha Jackson-Jarvis
 Wendy Jacob
 Shannon Kennedy
 Zoe Leonard 
 Zhi Lin 
 Jyung Park
 Alex Rivera
 Jason Salavon
 Joseph Scanlan
 Sue Schaffner
 Mary Ellen Strom
 Mel Ziegler

See also 
 Creative Capital

References

Arts-related lists
Lists of award winners